Nei or NEI may refer to:
 
Nei, Iran, a village in Ardabil Province, Iran
Nei, a character in the Phantasy Star II roleplaying game
Nutrition and Education International
Nuclear Energy Institute, American nuclear industry lobbying group
National Eye Institute, one of the US Institutes of Health
Netherlands East-Indies, also known as the Dutch East Indies
Northern Engineering Industries, a defunct British engineering firm
Noise-equivalent irradiance, in astronomy

People with the name Nei
Iivo Nei (born 1931), Estonian chess champion
Masatoshi Nei (born 1931), Japanese population geneticist
Nei Kato Japanese engineer
Nei (footballer born 1980), born Claudinei Alexandre Aparecido, Brazilian football striker
Nei (footballer born 1985), born Claudinei Cardoso Félix Silva, Brazilian football right-back
Nei (footballer, born 1991), born Jozinei João Machado Rodriguez, Brazilian football attacking midfielder

See also
Nai (disambiguation)
Neigh (disambiguation)
Ney (disambiguation)
Nie (disambiguation)
Nye (disambiguation)